Gold medals are awards typically given for the highest achievement in a field or competition.

Awards

Science and Engineering
 AAOU Gold Medal, awarded by Asian Association of Open Universities
 AAG Gold Medal, awarded by the Association of Applied Geochemists
 AIA Gold Medal, awarded by the American Institute of Architects
 Blodgett Gold Medal, awarded by the Institute of Physics
 Bragg Gold Medal, awarded by the Institute of Physics
 Australian Institute of Architects Gold Medal, the highest award of the Australian Institute of Architects
 Carl Mannerfelt Gold Medal of the International Cartographic Association
 CNRS Gold medal, the highest scientific research award in France 
 Dirac Gold Medal, awarded by the Institute of Physics
 Faraday Gold Medal, awarded by the Institute of Physics
 Glazebrook Medal, awarded by the Institute of Physics
 Gold Medal Award for Distinguished Archaeological Achievement, awarded by the Archaeological Institute of America
 Gold Medal of the Maritime Institute of Ireland
 Gold Medal of the Royal Astronomical Society, the highest award of the Royal Astronomical Society
 Gold Medal of the Royal Society of Medicine
 Gold Medal of the Royal Canadian Geographical Society
 Gold Medal of the Royal Scottish Geographical Society
 Founder's Medal and Patron's Medal, awarded by the Royal Geographical Society, UK
 Gold Medal of the Institution of Structural Engineers
 Kelvin Gold Medal, awarded by the Institute of Physics
 Langley Gold Medal, awarded for aeronautics and astronautics by the Smithsonian Institution
 Lomonosov Gold Medal, award in the natural sciences and the humanities by the Russian Academy of Sciences
 Newton Gold Medal, awarded by the Institute of Physics
 Oswald Watt Gold Medal, awarded by Royal Federation of Aero Clubs of Australia
 Penrose Gold Medal, awarded for geology by the Society of Economic Geologists
 Royal Gold Medal, awarded by the Royal Institute of British Architects, UK
 SPIE Gold Medal, the highest honor of Society for Optics and Photonics
 Symons Gold Medal of the Royal Meteorological Society
 Mason Gold Medal of the Royal Meteorological Society

Military
 Gold Medal of Military Valour, an Italian military award established in 1793
 Army Gold Medal, a British military campaign medal
 Gold Service Medal, of South Africa

Sport
 Olympic gold medal
 Svenska Dagbladet Gold Medal, for Swedish sports achievement of the year, awarded by the Swedish newspaper Svenska Dagbladet

Arts
 ALS Gold Medal, awarded by the Australian Literature Society
 Gold Medal (National Eisteddfod of Wales), awarded for excellence in the arts by the National Eisteddfod of Wales
 Hopkinson Gold Medal, for piano performance, awarded by the Royal College of Music
 Photoplay Gold Medal, a cinematic award (1944–1968) of Photoplay magazine
 Robert Capa Gold Medal, for photography, awarded by the Overseas Press Club of America

Other
 Congressional Gold Medal, awarded by the United States Congress
 Department of Commerce Gold Medal, the highest award presented by the United States Secretary of Commerce
 PDSA Gold Medal, awarded by the UK's People's Dispensary for Sick Animals

See also
 Gold medal (disambiguation)
 Gold Award (disambiguation)

Gold medal
Medal awards